Yogananda (योगानंद, Yōgānanda) is a Sanskrit name meaning Yoga bliss. Notable individuals with this name include

 Paramahansa Yogananda, Indian yoga teacher who introduced Yoga to the United States
 Swami Yogananda, 19th century Indian mystic
 Yogananda Pittman, the first African-American chief of the United States Capitol Police

It may also refer to the 
 Yogananda Institute of Technology and Science in Tirupati, Andhra Pradesh, India